Mahana (also known as Islampur) is a Seorai town Of Ghazipur District, Uttar Pradesh, India.

Historical Population

References

Towns and villages in Kamsar